Amathia may refer to:
 Amathia is a variant spelling of Amatheia (mythology)
 Amathia (bryozoan), a genus of bryozoans in the family Vesiculariidae
 Amathia, a genus of crustaceans in the family Epialtidae, synonym of Anamathia
 Amathia, a genus of arthropods in the family Phytoseiidae, synonym of Neoseiulus
 Amathia, a genus of amphipods in the family Gammarellidae, synonym of Gammarellus